Mario Mattioli (1 January 1945 – 30 May 2003) was an Italian volleyball player. He played 233 international matches for the Italian team, winning the 1970 Summer Universiade and finishing second at the 1975 Mediterranean Games and eighth at the 1976 Summer Olympics.

References

1945 births
2003 deaths
Olympic volleyball players of Italy
Volleyball players at the 1976 Summer Olympics
Italian men's volleyball players
Mediterranean Games silver medalists for Italy
Competitors at the 1975 Mediterranean Games
Mediterranean Games medalists in volleyball
Universiade medalists in volleyball
Universiade gold medalists for Italy